Wimberly, Allison, Tong & Goo, also known as WATG, is an architectural firm with offices in London, Singapore, Istanbul, Honolulu, Irvine, Los Angeles, New York, Seattle and Chicago. They have designed projects in 160 countries across six continents.

History
George ‘Pete’ Wimberly and Howard L. Cook started renovations on the Royal Hawaiian Hotel in 1945, and formed Wimberly and Cook in Honolulu, Hawaii. In 1971, George Whisenand, Jerry Allison, Greg Tong and Don Goo joined Pete Wimberly; in 1988 the firm became Wimberly Allison Tong and Goo, also known as WATG.

As of 2014, WATG is owned by an Employee Benefit Trust.

Recognition 
WATG was awarded the Aga Khan Award for Architecture for its Tanjong Jara Beach Hotel and Rantau Abang Visitor Center in Terengganu, Malaysia.

Notable projects
Atlantis Paradise Island, Paradise Island, the Bahamas
Disneyland Hotel, Paris, France
Encore Las Vegas, Las Vegas Strip in Paradise, Nevada
Emirates Palace, Abu Dhabi, United Arab Emirates
ITC Royal Bengal Kolkata, West Bengal, India
LEED Platinum Bardessono Hotel, Yountville, California
Royal Opera House Muscat (ROHM), Muscat, Oman
 Lisboa Palace, Cotai in Macau
The Leela Palace Bengaluru, Karnataka, India

References

External links

Architecture firms of the United States